Umberto Spadaro (8 November 1904 – 12 October 1981) was an Italian film actor.

He appeared in around 95 films between 1940 and 1979. His brother Peppino Spadaro was also an actor.

Selected filmography

 Cavalleria rusticana (1939) – Saltimbanco (uncredited)
 Senza cielo (1940)
 Caravaggio (1941)
 Blood Wedding (1941) – Maso
 Il cavaliere senza nome (1941)
 Catene invisibili (1942) – Un amico di Enrico al biliardo
 The Two Orphans (1942) – Il custode della stazione
 Wedding Day (1942) – Un cameriere (uncredited)
 Jealousy (1942) – Il testimone Sante di Mauro
 L'usuraio (1943)
 Two Hearts Among the Beasts (1943) – Lo stregone
 Sempre più difficile (1943) – Mucugno
 Rita of Cascia (1943) – Il delatore nella taverna
 Vietato ai minorenni (1944)
 Macario Against Zagomar (1944) – Touzille, il cenciaiolo
 Mist on the Sea (1944) – Il fuochista
 La Fornarina (1944) – Un cliente dell'osteria
 For the Love of Mariastella (1946) – Fifì il gobbo, calzolaio
 Fury (1947) – Rocco
 The Opium Den (1947)
 L'apocalisse (1947)
 Tombolo (1947)
 Il principe ribelle (1947)
 Legge di sangue (1948) – Gaetano
 Difficult Years (1948) – Aldo Piscitello
 I cavalieri dalle maschere nere (1948) – Gegè
 Ladri di biciclette (1948) – (uncredited)
 Il corriere di ferro (1948)
 Flying Squadron (1949) – Don Leoni
 Women Without Names (1950) – Pietro – guardia del campo
 Il Mulatto (1950) – Don Gennaro
 The Outlaws (1950) – Don Ciccio Balestrieri
 Pact with the Devil (1950) – Scoppola – the killer
 Angelo tra la folla (1950) – La Spada
 Il Brigante Musolino (1950) – Doctor Micheli
 Strano appuntamento (1950) – Rossi
 La taverna della libertà (1950)
 Il nido di Falasco (1950) – Luccio
 Brief Rapture (1951) – Commissario capo
 Without a Flag (1951) – Natale Papini – Lo scassinatore
 Appointment for Murder (1951) – Detective Pietrangeli
 A Woman Has Killed (1952) – Padre di Anna
 The Man in My Life (1952)
 The Eternal Chain (1952) – Maresciallo della legione straniera
 The Secret of Three Points (1952) – Colonnello Grimaldi
 Serenata amara (1952) – Il maestro di musica
 Papà ti ricordo (1952)
 The Angel of Sin (1952) – Scarpone
 Cats and Dogs (1952) – Don Filippo
 Jolanda la figlia del corsaro nero (1953) – Padre putativo di Jolanda
 Riscatto (1953) – Il cappellano Don Giulietti
 A Husband for Anna (1953) – Don Antonio Percucoco
 I Vinti (1953) – (uncredited)
 Martin Toccaferro (1953) – Signor Costanzi
 Journey to Love (1953) – Torquato Merumi
 Scampolo 53 (1953)
 Fatal Desire (1953) – Uncle Brasi
 Carmen (1953) – Commissario Barreiro
 Lasciateci in pace (1953) – Achille Buongiorno
 Passionate Song (1953) – Il Commissario
 Non vogliamo morire (1954) – Capitano del battello
 Tears of Love (1954) – Don Vincenzo Benetti
 Magic Village (1955) – Don Puglisi
 Je suis un sentimental (1955) – L'opéré
 Don Camillo e l'on. Peppone (1955) – Bezzi
 The Best Part (1955) – Gino – un ouvrier piémontais
 La catena dell'odio (1955) – Neri
 Amaramente (1956) – Commissario Ferri
 Manos sucias (1957) – Valero
 The Wide Blue Road (1957) – Gaspare Puggioni, 1st Coast Guard Officer
 A Farewell to Arms (1957) – Barber (uncredited)
 Ya tenemos coche (1958) – Don José
 Love and Troubles (1958) – Antonio
 Nella città l'inferno (1959) – Direttore del carcere
 Under Ten Flags (1960) – Telegrafista
 The Four Monks (1962) – L'ortolano
 The Eye of the Needle (1963) – Luigino Trizzini – father of Rosaria
 Liolà (1964)
 A Fistful of Dollars (1964) – Miguel – Rojo Gunman (uncredited)
 Hercules and the Treasure of the Incas (1964) – Darmon Henchman
 The Naked Hours (1964) – Nonno
 Ballata da un miliardo (1967)
 Lo voglio maschio (1971)
 The Big Family (1973)
 La governante (1974)
 La sbandata (1974) – Doctor
 Il gatto mammone (1975) – Doctor
 I baroni (1975)

External links

Umberto Spadaro. cinematografo.it

Italian male film actors
1904 births
1981 deaths
Nastro d'Argento winners
20th-century Italian male actors
Male Spaghetti Western actors